Abdelaziz Dnibi (born January 13, 1975) is a former Moroccan footballer who previously played for Persikab Bandung in the Liga Indonesia Premier Division.

References

External links

1975 births
Association football midfielders
Moroccan expatriate footballers
Moroccan expatriate sportspeople in Indonesia
Moroccan footballers
Expatriate footballers in Indonesia
Liga 1 (Indonesia) players
Singapore Premier League players
Living people
Persikab Bandung players
PSIS Semarang players
Geylang International FC players
Expatriate footballers in Singapore
Olympique Club de Khouribga players
Palermo F.C. players
Serie B players
Expatriate footballers in Italy
Moroccan football managers